Kronberg Castle is a High Middle Ages Rock castle in Kronberg im Taunus, Hochtaunuskreis district, Hesse state, Germany. The castle is beside Altkönig in Taunus. The castle was built between 1220 and 1230.

References 
 Website des Burgvereins
 Burg Kronberg auf www.taunus.info

External links 
 

Kronberg im Taunus
Castles in Hesse
Buildings and structures in Hochtaunuskreis